Justin Williams (born May 26, 1989) is a Belizean-American cyclist who currently is a rider-manager for UCI Continental team . He began racing as a teen and won multiple amateur US National Championships in track, road, and criterium. He focuses on increasing the diversity of the sport and founded and manages a team in order to mentor young African American and Hispanic riders.

Career 

Williams grew up in South-Central Los Angeles. His parents were immigrants from Belize. Williams played football with his cousins growing up, but his football career was ended by injury and the disapproval of his mother.

Williams's father was an amateur bike racer, and Williams took up riding to try to connect with his father. Williams's first bike ride was planned to be 70 miles along the Pacific Coast Highway but it ended when he cramped up after 50 miles. His father rode away and left Williams on the side of the road where his aunt picked him up. Williams understood the message his father was trying to convey: "Racing bikes is hard and you need to be serious about it." He began racing a few months later. Williams knew there were not a lot of opportunities for black men in South-Central and saw cycling as a means to avoid getting in trouble with the law.

Williams did well in the sport, winning many Criteriums in California as a teen. His goal was to join the US National Team, but felt that they ignored him despite his racing results. Williams eventually made the team after winning the 2006 Junior Track National Championship in Keirin. The National Team wanted Williams to focus on track cycling but he loved road racing and wanted to continue training for that.

As a teen, Williams's father had introduced him to racer Rahsaan Bahati, and was from Bahati that Williams realized he could go professional and race in Europe. Williams joined the Rock Racing team in 2007—the same team his mentor Bahati raced for—while still racing with the national team. Rock Racing folded in 2009 and Williams moved to Axel Merckx’s Trek-Livestrong development team for the 2010 racing season. In 2010, Williams went to Europe where he had success in Kermesse races in Belgium. He was a domestique for Taylor Phinney in the 2010 Paris–Roubaix Espoirs race that Phinney won. Although the national team coaches felt that Williams had a lot of potential, Williams decided not to go back to Europe after flying home to visit his family during the 2010 season.

Williams had developed a reputation for being "hard to deal with", but he contends it was in part due to being a young sprinter who needed guidance and part due to him being stereotyped as an "angry black man". With his professional career seemingly ended when he left the national team, Williams moved back to California and attended Moorpark College. He raced for a few low level teams during this time, but did not have much success.

William's younger brother, Cory Williams, joined Cylance Pro Cycling and convinced them to hire Justin Williams as well. Williams was hesitant to get back into professional racing, but saw it as a good opportunity to support his brother. Despite his initial trepidation, Williams had a breakout season, winning 15 races. Cylance promised Williams they would keep Cory on the team, but they cut him after one year. Williams was contractually obligated to continue racing, and although he debated sandbagging he decided that "I don't win for them, I win for me" and had another stellar season, racking up 14 wins.

In 2018, Williams signed with Specialized-Rocket Espresso fixie criterium racing team at the Red Hook Crit. He felt instantly at home with the other team members, and appreciated the lack of politics and drama that he had tired of on the UCI circuit. The team allowed Williams to compete as an independent rider in road races as well. Williams won both the amateur  road race and criterium national championships in 2018. He placed in the top 3 in 30 of the 35 races he rode that year.

In 2019, Williams founded his own team, L39ion of Los Angeles, where he is both the manager and primary sprinter. The team is a mix of profession cyclists and development riders, many from South-Central LA, as well as both of Williams's brothers. The "39" in the name represents 39th street where Williams grew up. Williams once again won the amateur criterium national championship.

Williams found racing at the pro level difficult because he was the only minority, and that made him want to make the sport of cycling "great for everyone". This experience led him to work for increased inclusion and innovation in cycling. As part of that effort, he mentors African American and Hispanic riders on his development team, Endo CNCPT.

In June 2021, Williams officially changed his UCI nationality to Belize, and won the Belizean national road race championships later that month.

In August 2022, Williams was suspended from racing for 5 months as a result of his engaging in a fist fight with other racers at the Salt Lake Criterium.

Major results

2006
 National Junior Track Championships
1st  Keirin 
1st  Match sprint 
1st  Team pursuit
1st  Team sprint
2007
 National Junior Track Championships
1st  Keirin
1st  Team pursuit
2008
 1st  Keirin, National Amateur Track Championships
 1st  Criterium, National Under-23 Road Championships
 1st Stage 3 Valley of the Sun Stage Race
 2nd Keirin, National Track Championships
2009
 1st  Team pursuit, National Track Championships
2014
 1st Stages 4 & 5 Tour of America's Dairyland
2016
 1st Stages 1b & 3 North Star Grand Prix
 1st San Rafael Sunset Criterium
 1st 
2017
 1st 
 1st Stage 2 Tour de Delta
 1st Stage 4 North Star Grand Prix
 1st Stage 8 Tour of America's Dairyland
 1st Stages 1 & 3 Oklahoma City Classic
2018
 National Amateur Road Championships
1st  Road race
1st  Criterium
 1st Overall Tour de Murrieta
1st Stage 1
 1st 
 1st Sequoia Cycling Classic
 1st Ladera Ranch Grand Prix
 1st 
 1st Stages 1 & 4 
2019
 1st  Road race, National Amateur Road Championships
 1st 
 1st Salt Lake Criterium
 1st Littleton Twilight Criterium
 2nd Overall Tulsa Tough
1st Blue Dome Crit
1st Tulsa Arts Crit
2nd Omnium
2021
 1st  Road race, National Road Championships

References

External links 
 
 
 

Living people
1989 births
American male cyclists
Cyclists from Los Angeles
UCI Track Cycling World Champions (men)